Raju Kaji Shakya is a Nepalese football manager and former footballer who captained the Nepal national football team. He is current manager of New Road Team.
Born in July 1960 in Dharan, Nepal, he has also served as head coach of Nepal national football team.

Career
Shakya started playing Professional football from 1975. His international career involved playing for the Nepal national football team from 1981 to 1997, where he served as captain from 1981–1997. Also, he has played professional football in Bangladesh league.

In 1987, Shakya led Nepal in three notable international friendlies, against USSR and East Germany in 1987 and West Germany in 1989.

Coaching career
From 1991 to 1993, Shakya attended Futuro (a FIFA-accredited coaching course) as part of the Coca-Cola World Football Development Programme in Nepal. In 1998, he later gained an FA international coaching B-licence accredited by UEFA in England. 4 years later, Shakya gained further qualification with the AFC coaching C-licence in Nepal.

Shakya began coaching the Nepal national football team's U-14 squad for the 2004 AFC U-14 Football Festival. After this, Shakya attended a short-term course for football coaching accredited by the German NOC and German Football Association in Nepal (2004). Finally, 4 years later Shakya gained an international C-licence from the Japan Football Association in 2008.

In May 2013 Shakya extended his contract with Machhindra Football Club to continue as head coach so that he would remain in charge for the rest of the season.

In 2013, Shakya was appointed as the interim coach for Nepal national football team, until Jack Stefanowski was re-instated as head coach.

In October 2014 Shakya was appointed head coach of Three Star Club, which he took as defending champions to the 35th edition of the Governor's Gold Cup as defending champions. They however lost to Sikkim FA because of an extra time own goal.

In January 2015 Shakya was appointed head coach of Manang Marshyangdi Club replacing Nabin Neupane. Neupane wasn't sacked but rather will now act as Shakya's assistant coach for the upcoming 2014-15 Nepal Redbull national league.

He was appointed head coach of New Road Team.

Honours

Club
ANFA Cup (1): 1981
 Nara Trophy (1): Unknown
 Birthday Cup (1): Unknown
 Tribhuvan Challenge Shield' (1): Unknown
 Mahendra Gold Cup (2): Unknown Amatay Gold Cup (1): Unknown Rupak Smirti Cup (1): Unknown Coco-Cola Cup Kathmandu (1): Unknown Tillotama Gold Cup (1): Unknown Mahatma Buddha Gold Cup (1): Unknown Bikash Running Cup (1): Unknown Karuwa Cup (1): Unknown Shahid Smarak A Division Football League (1): 1995
 National Games (1): Unknown Sikkim Governor's Gold Cup (4): 1981, 1990, 1991, 1992
 All India Brigade of Gurkha Gold Cup (1): 1982
 Sanjay Gandhi Gold Cup (1): 1983
 Jingmisingi Gold Cup (1): 1990

National team
South Asian Games Gold Medal (2): 1984, 1993
South Asian Games Silver Medal (2): 1987, 1999
South Asian Games Bronze Medal (1): 1985

Individual
Most Valuable Player of the Year (1): 1992 
The Statesman Society Award (1): Unknown''Player of the Year - Nepal Jaycees (1): 1993Player of the Year - Nepal Journalist Association (1): 1993Rupak Best Player Award - ANFA (1): 1996Lifetime Achievement Award - ANFA''' (1): 2005

References

External links
 Official website

See also
Hari Khadka
All Nepal Football Association

1960 births
Living people
People from Dharan
Sportspeople from Kathmandu
Nepalese footballers
Nepal international footballers
Nepalese football managers
Nepal national football team managers
Association football forwards
Expatriate footballers in Bangladesh
Nepalese expatriate footballers
South Asian Games gold medalists for Nepal
South Asian Games silver medalists for Nepal
South Asian Games bronze medalists for Nepal
South Asian Games medalists in football
Footballers at the 1994 Asian Games
Asian Games competitors for Nepal